Usual suspects may refer to:

"Round up the usual suspects", a famous line of dialogue, from the 1942 film Casablanca
The Usual Suspects, 1995 movie
Usual Suspects (Rick Ross song), 2009 single by Miami rapper Rick Ross
The Usual Suspects (album), 2005 album by rock singer Joe Lynn Turner
 "The Usual Suspects" (Supernatural), an episode of the television series Supernatural
 Usual Suspects (song), 2015 single by rap rock band Hollywood Undead
 Usual Suspects (album), a 1997 album by the 5th Ward Boyz
 Usual Suspects Gang, hip hop collective from London

See also
Unusual Suspects (disambiguation)